Jennifer or Jenny Newstead may refer to:

 Jennifer Gillian Newstead, American attorney
 Jenny Newstead (swimmer) (born ), New Zealand Paralympic swimmer

Other
 Jenny Newstead (novel), 1932 novel by Marie Bellow Lowndes